The Conmen in Vegas is a 1999 Hong Kong action comedy film produced, written and directed by Wong Jing and is a sequel to the 1998 film The Conman. The film stars original returning cast members Andy Lau and Nick Cheung with new cast members Natalis Chan, Kelly Lin, Meggie Yu, Alex Man and Jewel Lee in her debut film role. The film was partially filmed in the Caesars Palace Resort, Las Vegas.

Plot
The story directly follows The Conman, where Dragon's sister, Ching, has left to study in Canada. After King and Dragon defeat Macau Mon, they become swindling partners. Along with Dragons' older cousin Luk Chard, the trio try swindling a large amount of money from Big Eyed Man at his underground casino. While the trio are enjoying themselves, unexpectedly, Man sends people to kill them and kidnap Dragon.

King and Luk Chard are brought to the Senior Chinese Front. It turns out that they want to hire them to go to Las Vegas to complete a task: to catch Peter Chu, a man who was in charge of multiple Tofu-dreg projects in the past few years in China, and then stole a large amount of money and fled to the United States. Because Chu is backed by many American politicians and organised gangs, they could not use diplomatic and legal channels to extradite him, they could only send a few gambling experts to catch him in the Caesars Palace casino where he visits daily. King and Luk would receive $120,000,000 as a reward. Since King needs to give $30,000,000 to Big Eyed Man to rescue Dragon, he accepts the task and goes to Las Vegas with Luk Chard.

Upon arriving in Las Vegas, King and Luk Chard encounters two gorgeous ladies Betty and Sammi, whom they previously met in Hong Kong. The four of them set a trap where Sammi seduces Chu and successfully capture him, but Chu has secretly notified his henchmen and girlfriend, Fei-fei, who are waiting for the arrival of the four at the airport, so King decides to escort Chu via a road trip to Los Angeles and board a flight there. However, Chu tries to break free on the way, which startles the bus driver and passengers, causing the four  and Chu to travel on foot in the desert, where both Chu and Luk Chard suffer from rattlesnake bites. Luckily, King encounters his friend, adult film director Handsome Wu, who was filming in the desert. Wu helps King stage a rescue attack using cinematic effects to fool Chu and successfully escorts the latter back to China to be taken by the SCF, who have rescued Dragon from Big Eyed Man The FBI was able to retrieve the stolen money after King and Handsome trick Chu into revealing the password of his safe. In the end, King and Betty also become lovers.

Cast
Andy Lau as King, a master gambler and con artist who helps the a Senior Chinese Front (SCF) in capturing swindler Peter Chu in order to save his abducted apprentice, Dragon.
Natalis Chan as Luk Chard, (阿叻), Dragon's older cousin who serves as King's side kick.
Nick Cheung as Dragon (化骨龍), King's apprentice who was abducted by Big Eyed Man after swindling the latter.
Kelly Lin as Betty (阿扁), a Taiwanese girl sent by the SCF to assist King and Luk Chard and develops a romance with the former.
Meggie Yu as Sammi (小心), Betty's friend who was also sent by the SCF to assist King and Luk Chard in capturing Peter Chu.
Jewel Lee as Fei-fei (菲菲), Peter Chu's girlfriend and bodyguard.
Alex Man as Peter Chu (朱培琨), a swindler wanted by the Chinese government after getting rich in Tofu-dreg project schemes.
Nam Yin as Big Eyed Man 大眼文), a triad leader who abducts Dragon, who schemed with King and Luk Chard to swindle him.
Wong Jing as Handsome Wu, King's friend who is an adult film director working in Hollywood.
Leung Kei-hei as Big Eyed Man's thug.
So Wai-nam as Big Eyed Man's thug.

Theme song
Only You in My Heart (心只有你)
Composer: Duck Lau
Lyricist: Andy Lau
Singer: Andy Lau

Box office
The film grossed HK$17,761,670 during its theatrical run from 25 June to 21 July 1999 in Hong Kong.

See also
 List of films set in Las Vegas

External links

The Conmen in Vegas at Hong Kong Cinemagic

The Conmen in Vegas film review at LoveHKFilm.com

1999 films
1999 martial arts films
1999 action comedy films
Films about con artists
Hong Kong action comedy films
Hong Kong martial arts films
1990s adventure comedy films
Films about gambling
Hong Kong sequel films
1990s Cantonese-language films
China Star Entertainment Group films
Films directed by Wong Jing
Films set in Hong Kong
Films set in the Las Vegas Valley
Films shot in Hong Kong
Films shot in the Las Vegas Valley
1990s Hong Kong films